Home to Roost is a compilation album by British rock band Atomic Rooster. It is made up of material from their first three studio albums.

It has been issued on at least three separate occasions. The first time was in 1977, as a double LP on the Mooncrest label. In 1986 it was reissued with a new sleeve design on the Raw Power (Castle Communications) label. This time, the two LPs were accompanied by a 12 track CD release, which was Atomic Rooster's first in that format. Early CDs only had just over one hour's maximum playing time, causing 8 of the 20 tracks to be omitted, in order to facilitate a single disc. Lastly, it was reissued in 1989 by Receiver Records, rather confusingly retitled Devil's Answer and sporting yet another new cover design. This time, it appeared only as a double CD which contained all 20 original tracks.  The second CD of 10 tracks was also released separately in 1989 by Action Replay Records under the title The Best & The Rest Of Atomic Rooster.

Although, as of January 2010, there are at least 10 different Atomic Rooster compilations entitled Devil's Answer, the one in question is the only double CD.

Track listing 
LP/CD 1
 "Death Walks Behind You"
 "V.U.G." *
 "Seven Streets"
 "Sleeping for Years"
 "I Can't Take No More" *
 "Nobody Else" *
 "Friday the 13th"
 "And So to Bed" *
 "Broken Wings"
 "Before Tomorrow"
LP/CD 2
 "Banstead"
 "Winter" *
 "Breakthrough"
 "Decision/Indecision" *
 "Devil’s Answer"
 "A Spoonful of Bromide Helps the Pulse Rate Go Down"
 "Black Snake"
 "Head in the Sky" *
 "Tomorrow Night"
 "Break the Ice" *
*Omitted from the 1986 single CD release.

Atomic Rooster compilation albums
1977 compilation albums